Sara Bertolasi (29 April 1988, Busto Arsizo) is an Italian rower. At the 2012 Summer Olympics, she competed in the Women's coxless pair with Claudia Wurzel.  At the 2016 Olympic Games, she competed in the same event with Alessandra Patelli. She was part of the Italian women's eight who won the silver medal at the 2012 European Rowing Championships on home water in Varese.  She and Wurzel won bronze at the 2011 European Rowing Championships.

References

Living people
Italian female rowers
Olympic rowers of Italy
Rowers at the 2012 Summer Olympics
Rowers at the 2016 Summer Olympics
1988 births
People from Busto Arsizio
European Championships (multi-sport event) bronze medalists
Sportspeople from the Province of Varese